Juan Antonio Morales (born April 18, 1969) is a retired Spanish professional basketball player.

Professional career
Morales started his career from the local club Loyola Bilbao. In 1987 he transferred to Joventut Badalona. He played eight years with the Catalan club and he won two Spanish Championship, the Korac Cup and EuroLeague. He continued his career in Real Madrid Baloncesto from 1995 to 1997; he completed his collection with European titles with FIBA Saporta Cup in 1997. Morales also played three years in the whole with P.A.O.K. BC, Saski Baskonia, Panionios B.C., Basket Rimini Crabs and Olympiacos B.C. His last title was the Greek Basketball Cup in 1999. He end his career in 1999, playing with Olympiakos.

National team
Morales played with Spain men's national basketball team in 1988 FIBA World Olympic Qualifying Tournament, but his missed the Olympic tournament due to a serious ankle injury. He also took part at the EuroBasket 1989 and EuroBasket 1993. Moreover, he won the silver medal in 1987 Mediterranean Games and 1985 FIBA Europe Under-16 Championship

References

External links
at acb.com
at esake.gr
at fibaeurope.com
at fiba.com

1969 births
Living people
Basket Rimini Crabs players
Joventut Badalona players
Liga ACB players
Olympiacos B.C. players
Panionios B.C. players
P.A.O.K. BC players
Saski Baskonia players
Real Madrid Baloncesto players
Spanish men's basketball players
Spanish expatriate sportspeople in Greece
Sportspeople from Bilbao
Mediterranean Games medalists in basketball
Mediterranean Games silver medalists for Spain
Competitors at the 1987 Mediterranean Games
Centers (basketball)
Basketball players from the Basque Country (autonomous community)